End of Silence may refer to:

 End of Silence (Red album), 2006
 The End of Silence, a 1992 album by Rollins Band